Ilipula is a monotypic genus of Vietnamese nursery web spiders containing the single species, Ilipula anguicula. It was first described by Eugène Louis Simon in 1903, and is only found in Vietnam.

See also
 List of Pisauridae species

References

Monotypic Araneomorphae genera
Pisauridae
Spiders of Asia